Lou Bradley is an Australian alternative country singer. Her debut album Love Someone was nominated for the ARIA Award for Best Country Album.

Discography

Albums

Awards and nominations

ARIA Music Awards
The ARIA Music Awards are a set of annual ceremonies presented by Australian Recording Industry Association (ARIA), which recognise excellence, innovation, and achievement across all genres of the music of Australia. They commenced in 1987. 

! 
|-
| 2007 || Love Someone || ARIA Award for Best Country Album ||  ||

References

External links
 Lou Bradley Official site
 www.nrfest.com Nimbin Roots Festival official site.

Australian country singers
Australian women singer-songwriters
Living people
Year of birth missing (living people)
Place of birth missing (living people)